Estádio Romário de Souza Faria, also known as Marrentão, is a football (soccer) stadium located in Xerém, a district of Duque de Caxias, Brazil. It is named after Brazilian footballer Romário de Souza Faria. The stadium is owned by Duque de Caxias. It replaced Estádio Mestre Telê Santana, nicknamed Maracanãzinho, as Duque de Caxias' home ground.

History
The stadium was inaugurated in December 2007, when Duque de Caxias and Vasco da Gama drew 1–1. The first official game was played on January 30, 2008, when Cardoso Moreira beat Duque de Caxias 2–1.

On October 2, 2008, the Brazilian Fire Department approved the use of all 10,000 stadium seats. The stadium's capacity was previously limited to 4,000 people.

References

Football venues in Rio de Janeiro (state)
Duque de Caxias, Rio de Janeiro
Duque de Caxias Futebol Clube
Sports venues in Rio de Janeiro (state)